is the sixth single of the J-pop idol group Morning Musume, released on July 14, 1999 as an 8 cm CD. It has sold over 170,670 copies and reached number five on the Oricon Charts. In 2004 it was re-released as part of the Early Single Box and again in 2005 as a 12 cm CD. The lead vocalist of this single was Natsumi Abe.

Furusato has since become a Morning Musume/Hello! Project standard, with many Morning Musume members having sung their own solo versions. As of September 2005, versions by Nozomi Tsuji, Mari Yaguchi, Ai Takahashi and Risa Niigaki were released to fan club members, while Yuko Nakazawa has done an acoustic version on her second solo album, Natsumi Abe has re-recorded it for her 2004 solo album Hitoribocchi and Junjun sang it as her graduation song on December 15, 2010.

Track listing

8 cm CD 
  – 5:18
  – 4:49
  – 5:16

12 cm CD (Early Single Box and individual release) 
  – 5:18
  – 4:50
  – 5:19
  – 5:29

Members at the time of single 
 1st generation: Yuko Nakazawa, Aya Ishiguro, Kaori Iida, Natsumi Abe
 2nd generation: Kei Yasuda, Mari Yaguchi, Sayaka Ichii

Oricon rank and sales

References

External links 
 Furusato on the Up-Front Works official website

Morning Musume songs
Zetima Records singles
1999 singles
Song recordings produced by Tsunku
Japanese-language songs
1999 songs
Torch songs
Pop ballads
1990s ballads
Songs written by Tsunku